Basem Abdullah Eltahhan (born 17 August 1982 in Alexandria, Egypt) is an Egyptian former professional snooker player. Eltahhan turned professional in 2017 winning the African Championship.

Career
In 2017, Eltahhan beat fellow countryman Wael Talaat 6–5 in the final of the African Championship. The win gained him a two-year card on the World Snooker Tour for the 2017–18 and 2018–19 seasons.

Due to lack of sponsorship Eltahhan couldn't make his professional debut until the 2017 English Open. His only match win during the season came at the single-frame Shoot-Out event, although he impressed at the 2017 UK Championship, battling world number 1 Mark Selby before ultimately losing 4–6; Selby praised his opponent afterwards, saying that Eltahhan played like a top-32 player. Eltahhan failed to win a single match during the next season, which ended with a 10-0 whitewash at the hands of Liang Wenbo at the 2019 World Championship qualifying rounds, and thus was relegated from the tour.

Performance and rankings timeline

Career finals

Amateur finals: 1 (1 title)

References

External links

Basem Eltahhan at worldsnooker.com

Egyptian snooker players
1982 births
Living people